M. D. Namal Karunaratne is a Sri Lankan politician and former member of the Parliament of Sri Lanka.

On 8 March 2007, Karunaratne was appointed to a Select Committee of Parliament to look into the alarming increase in traffic accidents.

References 

Living people
Members of the 13th Parliament of Sri Lanka
Janatha Vimukthi Peramuna politicians
United People's Freedom Alliance politicians
1968 births